Events from the year 1785 in Austria

Incumbents
 Monarch – Joseph II

Events

 
 

 
 - Treaty of Fontainebleau (1785)

Births

Deaths

References

 
Years of the 18th century in Austria